Streptomyces smaragdinus is a Gram-positive bacterium species from the genus of Streptomyces which has been isolated from the gut of the termite Macrotermes natalensis.

See also 
 List of Streptomyces species

References 

smaragdinus
Bacteria described in 2020